This is an index of Wikipedia articles in philosophy of language

 A.P. Martinich
 Aboutness
 Adolph Stöhr
 Alexis Kagame
 Alfred Jules Ayer
 Alphabet of human thought
 Ambiguity
 Analytic-synthetic distinction
 Anaphora
 Andrea Bonomi
 Applicative Universal Grammar
 Archie J. Bahm
 Arda Denkel
 Aristotle
 Artificial intelligence
 Association for Logic, Language and Information
 Avrum Stroll
 Barry Loewer
 Berlin Circle
 Bertrand Russell
 Bob Hale (philosopher)
 Calculus ratiocinator
 Carl Gustav Hempel
 Ramsey sentence
 Categorization
 Category mistake
 Causal theory of reference
 César Chesneau Dumarsais
 Cheung Kam Ching
 Circular definition
 Claude Lévi-Strauss
 Cognitive synonymy
 Colloquial language
 Computational humor
 Concept
 Concept and object
 Conceptual metaphor
 Context-sensitive grammar
 Context principle
 Contextualism
 Contrast theory of meaning
 Contrastivism
 Cooperative principle
 Cora Diamond
 Cratylism
 Dagfinn Føllesdal
 David Efird
 David Kellogg Lewis
 De dicto and de re
 Definition
 Denotation
 Descriptivist theory of names
 Direct reference theory
 Direction of fit
 Discourse ethics
 Disquotational principle
 Donald Davidson (philosopher)
 Donkey pronoun
 Dramatism
 Duns Scotus
 Empty name
 Engineered language
 Enumerative definition
 Epistemicism
 Ethics and Language
 Eugen Rosenstock-Huessy
 European Summer School in Logic, Language and Information
 Exemplification
 Extensional definition
 F. H. Bradley
 Family resemblance
 Felicity conditions
 Ferdinand Ebner
 Failure to refer
 Form of life (philosophy)
 Franz Rosenzweig
 Frege's Puzzle
 Friedrich Waismann
 Function and Concept
 G. E. M. Anscombe
 Gareth Evans (philosopher)
 Genus–differentia definition
 George Orwell
 Gilbert Ryle
 Gordon Park Baker
 Gottlob Frege
 Grammatology
 Hans Kamp
 Hector-Neri Castañeda
 Henri Bergson
 Ideal speech situation
 Illocutionary act
 Implicature
 Indeterminacy (philosophy)
 Indeterminacy of translation
 Indexicality
 Indirect self-reference
 Inferential role semantics
 Ingeborg Bachmann
 Intension
 Intensional definition
 Internalism and externalism
 Interpretation (logic)
 J. L. Austin
 Jacques Bouveresse
 James F. Conant
 Jody Azzouni
 John Etchemendy
 John McDowell
 Jonathan Bennett (philosopher)
 Journal of Logic, Language and Information
 Karl-Otto Apel
 Katarzyna Jaszczolt
 Keith Donnellan
 Kent Bach
 Kit Fine
 Language-game
 Language and thought
 Language of thought
 Language, Truth, and Logic
 Latitudinarianism (philosophy)
 Lexical definition
 Lexis (Aristotle)
 Linguistic determinism
 Linguistic relativity
 Linguistic turn
 Linguistics and Philosophy
 List of philosophers of language
 Logical atomism
 Logical form
 Logical positivism
 Ludwig Wittgenstein
 Marilyn Frye
 Martian scientist
 Max Black
 Meaning (linguistics)
 Meaning (non-linguistic)
 Meaning (philosophy of language)
 Meaning (semiotics)
 Mediated reference theory
 Meinong's jungle
 Mental representation
 Mental space
 Metalanguage
 Metaphor in philosophy
 Michael Devitt
 Michael Dummett
 Modal property
 Modistae
 Modularity of mind
 Moritz Schlick
 Mumbo Jumbo (phrase)
 Naming and Necessity
 Nelson Goodman
 New Foundations
 Nino Cocchiarella
 Noam Chomsky
 Nomenclature
 Nominalism
 Non-rigid designator
 Nonsense
 Norm (philosophy)
 On Denoting
 Ontological commitment
 Operational definition
 Ordinary language philosophy
 Ostensive definition
 Otto Neurath
 P. F. Strawson
 Paradigm-case argument
 Paralanguage
 Paul Boghossian
 Paul Grice
 Performative contradiction
 Performative text
 Performative utterance
 Persuasive definition
 Peter Abelard
 Peter Millican
 Philosophical interpretation of classical physics
 Philosophical Investigations
 Philosophy and literature
 Philosophy of language
 Pirmin Stekeler-Weithofer
 Plato's Problem
 Port-Royal Grammar
 Pragmatics
 Precising definition
 Principle of charity
 Principle of compositionality
 Private language argument
 Proper name (philosophy)
 Proposition
 Psychologism
 Quotation
 Radical translation
 Rational reconstruction
 Redundancy theory of truth
 Reference
 Relevance theory
 Rhetoric of social intervention model
 Richard von Mises
 Rigid designator
 Robert Brandom
 Robert Maximilian de Gaynesford
 Robert Stalnaker
 Round square copula
 Rudolf Carnap
 S. Morris Engel
 Saul Kripke
 Scalar implicature
 Scientific essentialism
 Sebastian Shaumyan
 Secondary reference
 Self-reference
 Semantic externalism
 Semantic holism
 Semantics
 Semeiotic
 Semiotics
 Sense and reference
 Sense and Sensibilia (Austin)
 Shabda
 Sign
 Singular term
 Slingshot argument
 Social semiotics
 Speech act
 Sphota
 Stanley Cavell
 Statement (logic)
 Stipulative definition
 Structuralism
 Supposition theory
 Susan Stebbing
 Swampman
 Symbiosism
 Symbol
 Symbol grounding
 Syntax
 The Naturalization of Intentionality
 Theoretical definition
 Theory of descriptions
 Þorsteinn Gylfason
 Tractatus Logico-Philosophicus
 Transparency (linguistic)
 True name
 Truth-conditional semantics
 Truth-value link
 Truthbearer
 Two Dogmas of Empiricism
 Type physicalism
Unilalianism
 Universal grammar
 Universal language
 Universal pragmatics
 Use–mention distinction
 Vagueness
 Verification theory
 Verificationism
 Vienna Circle
 Virgil Aldrich
 Walter Benjamin
 Willard Van Orman Quine
 William Alston
 William C. Dowling
 William Crathorn
 Wittgenstein on Rules and Private Language
 Word and Object
 Word sense
 Yehoshua Bar-Hillel
 Zeno Vendler
 Zhuangzi

 
Language